M6, also known as , is the most profitable private national French television channel and the third most watched television network in the French-speaking world. M6 is the head channel of the M6 Group media empire that owns several TV channels, magazines, publications, movie production and media-related firms etc. It is owned by RTL Group.

On 20 May 2021 it was announced that M6 Group, owners of the channel, has proposed a merger with TF1 Group, which owns TF1. On 16 September 2022, it was announced that the merger was officially abandoned.

History

M6 launched on 1 March 1987 at 11:15 am CET taking the place of TV6.

M6's current on-air brand image, introduced in May 2020 suggests that it tailors its service to teenagers and young-adult demographics. Its current programs lineup include:

 French TV shows: Les Bleus, Scènes de Ménages, Vous les femmes
 French TV programs : Capital, Zone Interdite, Enquête Exclusive, Top Chef, Un dîner presque parfait, 100% Mag, 66 Minutes, Recherche Appartement ou Maison, L'amour est dans le pré, Maison à vendre, On ne choisit pas ses voisins, Belle toute nue, Nouveau Look pour une nouvelle vie, Hits Machines, M6 Boutique, LE 1945 and LE 1245 (news), Top tendance, Le meilleur patissier de france, Danse avec les stars, Morning Live, ...
 American TV shows: Blue Bloods ; Elementary ; Criminal Minds: Beyond Borders (Esprits criminels : Unité sans frontières) ; Hawaii Five-0 (Hawaii 5-0) ; When Calls the Heart (Le cœur a ses raisons) ; Modern Family ; How to Get Away with Murder (Murder) ; NCIS: New Orleans (NCIS: Nouvelle Orléans) ; New Girl ; Quantico ; Reign (Reign : Le Destin d'une reine) ; Rosewood ; Scorpion ; Good Witch (Un soupçon de magie) ; Once Upon A Time ;  NCIS (NCIS: enquêtes spéciales) ; NCIS: Los Angeles ;  Prison Break ; Bones ; Supernatural and Secrets and Lies (Secrets and Lies : l'affaire Tom Murphy) ; The X-Files (X-Files, aux frontières du réel) ; 24: Legacy ; Bull ; Code Black ; MacGyver
 These American TV Shows were previously shown on M6: Smallville ;Scrubs ; The Unit (The Unit : commando d'élite) ;Stargate Atlantis ; Nip/Tuck ; Californication ; Kyle XY ; Everybody Hates Chris (Tout le monde déteste Chris) ;Terra Nova ; Desperate Housewives ;Lie to Me ;Medium (Médium) ; My Name Is Earl (Earl) ; NUMB3RS ; Charmed ; The 4400 (Les 4 400) ; Jericho ; The Dead Zone (Dead Zone) ; Stargate SG-1 ; Malcolm in the Middle (Malcolm) ; Friends ; Alias ; Sex and the City ; Veronica Mars ; Buffy the Vampire Slayer (Buffy contre les vampires) ; Ally McBeal ; Roswell ; Profiler ; The Pretender (Le Caméléon) ; The Sentinel ;  Sliders (Sliders, les mondes parallèles) ; Hope & Faith (La Star de la famille) ; 8 Simple Rules (Touche pas à mes filles) ; My Wife and Kids (Ma famille d'abord) ; Still Standing (Une famille presque parfaite) ; Early Edition (Demain à la Une) ; Wildfire ; Once and Again (Deuxième chance) ; Relic Hunter (Sydney Fox, l'aventurière) ; Medical Investigation (NIH : alertes médicales) ; Tru Calling (Tru Calling : compte à rebours) ; Commander in Chief ; 1-800-Missing (Missing : disparus sans laisser de trace) ; Dark Skies (Dark Skies : l'impossible vérité) ; The Inside (The Inside : dans la tête des tueurs) ; Killer Instinct ; Vanished ; John Doe ; LAX ; Jake 2.0 ; Blind Justice ; Threshold (Threshold : premier contact) ; Summerland ; Beautiful People ; Young Americans ; Special Unit 2 ; The Evidence (The Evidence : les preuves du crime) ; South Beach ; L.A. Heat (Los Angeles Heat) ; Married... with Children (Mariés, deux enfants) ;  The Cosby Show (Cosby Show) ; Who's the Boss? (Madame est servie) ; The Nanny (Une nounou d'enfer) ;  Little House on the Prairie (La Petite Maison dans la prairie); The Simpsons (Les Simpson) ; Bewitched (Ma sorcière bien-aimée) ; The Wonder Years (Les années coup de cœur) and Family Affair (Cher Oncle Bill).
 American programs: High School Musical ; Camp Rock ; America's Got Talent (with its own version : La France a un incroyable talent), American Idol (La Nouvelle Star), KaBlam! (KarToon (M6 version))
 British TV shows: Primeval ; Secret Diary of a Call Girl (Journal intime d'une call girl).
 British TV programs: Britain's Got Talent (with its own version : La France a un incroyable talent), Pop Idol (with its own version : Nouvelle Star), The X-Factor (with its own version), Wife Swap
 These British TV shows were previously shown on M6: Footballers' Wives (Femme$ de footballeurs) ; Queer as Folk ; Totally Frank ; Bugs ; and Hex (Hex : la malédiction).
 These Canadian TV shows were shown on M6: Sue Thomas: F.B.Eye (Sue Thomas, l'œil du FBI) and Falcon Beach.
 Investigative journalism shows, such as Capital, Zone interdite and Enquête Exclusive.
 Long-lasting short programs, such as Turbo, CinéSix, and E=M6, as well as numerous music videos.

In 2001, M6 became the first national French television network to broadcast reality programming. Its first program of this genre was Loft Story, and was highly watched. The president of TF1 at the time, Étienne Mougeotte, promised that TF1 would never air any reality programming. However, several months later, TF1 signed a contract with Endemol to air such programming. Endemol is the same company that created Loft Story for M6.

M6 is one of the only television services in France to have science-fiction programming as part of its regular schedule. Most supernatural dramas were shown on Saturday nights in what M6 called "la Trilogie du Samedi" (The Saturday Trilogy)

Current Programs

News
Le 12:45 (national edition) and 19:45 (national edition), afternoon and evening news.
Zone Interdite, France's most influential Newsmagazine
66 Minutes weekly news magazine.
Capital, Economy-oriented newsmagazine.
Enquête Exclusive, Investigation magazine.

Show and reality show 
Les reines du shopping
X Factor
Ice show
Nouvelle star, (French adaptation of Pop Idol) reality television (until 2011, then it moved on D8)
L'amour est dans le pré, French adaptation of Farmer Wants a Wife
D&CO , homestyle show.
E=M6, science magazine.
Top Chef, French adaptation of Top Chef
Belle toute nue, the French equivalent of Channel 4's How to Look Good Naked.
Turbo, motor magazine.
Chef, la recette, culinary magazine
Vocation Medecin, health magazine
Hit Machine, musical show.
M6 Kid, program for children.
Pekin Express, French adaptation of Dutch show Peking Express.
Off Prime
Accès Privé, entertainment news magazine
Un dîner presque parfait, the French adaptation of Come Dine with Me
Nouveau look pour une nouvelle vie, fashion magazine
On ne choisit pas ses voisins, family magazine
La France a un incroyable talent, the French adaptation of Britain's Got Talent
Le meilleur pâtissier de France, the French adaptation of The Great British Bake Off
Le choix, the French adaptation of The Taste.
Cauchemar en cuisine, the French adaptation of Kitchen Nightmares.
Show Me Your Voice, the French adaptation of I Can See Your Voice
Lego Masters

Series 
90210 Beverly Hills : Nouvelle Génération
Blue Bloods
Body of Proof
Bones
Burn Notice
Californication
Desperate Housewives
Drop Dead Diva
Earl
 (French creation)
FBI : Duo très spécial
Glee
Hawaii 5-0
Journal intime d'une call girl
Justified
Kaamelott (French creation)
 (French creation)
 (French creation)
Le Transporteur (French-Canadian creation)
Lie to Me
Ma famille d'abord
 (French creation)
Médium
Modern Family
NCIS : Enquêtes spéciales
NCIS: Los Angeles
New Girl
Numb3rs
Once Upon a Time
Ringer
Scènes de ménages (French creation)
Scrubs
Soda (French creation)
Sons of Anarchy
Supernatural
Terra Nova
The Finder
The Glades
The Good Wife
un gars une fille
Un, dos, tres
Under the Dome
 (French creation)
Wes et Travis

M6 Kid

 Presto ! Le manoir magique
 Alvinn!!! and the Chipmunks (Alvinnn !!! et les Chipmunks)
 The Adventures of Paddington (Les aventures de Paddington)
 Idéfix et les Irréductibles (Dogmatix and the Indomitables)
 Les filles de Dad

Past programs
Super Nanny
Culture Pub, a TV advertisements analysing show
Graines de star, a talents contests show
Loft Story (French adaptation of Big Brother), M6 and the first French reality show
Les colocataires (Roommates) a show similar to Loft Story.
Les Bleus (2006-2010) Police series about five rookies learning the ropes.
Morning Live, Morning show
Caméra Café, Comedy
Nouvelle Star (French adaptation of American Idol)
Êtes-vous plus fort qu'un élève de 10 ans ?, French adaptation of Are You Smarter Than a 5th Grader?
Rubí rebelde, Venezuelan telenovela
The Simpsons, moved to sister channel W9
Total Wipeout (French adaptation of Wipeout)
Stargate SG-1 The series has been fully aired between 18 September 1998 and 8 December 2007. 
Stargate Atlantis The first two seasons aired between 15 April 2005 and 29 July 2006.
Atomic Betty Only the first two seasons
The Toy Castle
Disney Kid Club, A 2 Programmed Block aired from 2010 to 2016, after M6 Kid and before M6 Kid.

See also 
List of television stations in France

References

External links
  
 M6 Replay

Television stations in France
French-language television stations
Television channels and stations established in 1987
1987 establishments in France
RTL Group